The 95th Massachusetts General Court, consisting of the Massachusetts Senate and the Massachusetts House of Representatives, met in 1874 during the governorships of William B. Washburn and Thomas Talbot. George B. Loring served as president of the Senate and John E. Sanford served as speaker of the House.

Senators

Representatives

See also
 43rd United States Congress
 List of Massachusetts General Courts

Images

References

Further reading

External links
 
 

Political history of Massachusetts
Massachusetts legislative sessions
massachusetts
1874 in Massachusetts